Arne is a village and civil parish in Dorset, England, situated  east of Wareham. The local travel links are located at Wareham railway station. The main road through the village is Arne Road connecting Arne to Wareham. The village is situated on the Arne Peninsula, which protrudes into Poole Harbour opposite the town of Poole.

Toponymy
The name "Arne" is first recorded in 1268. It probably derives from the  meaning a "house" or "building.

History
Evidence of prehistoric human activity within the civil parish consists of 19 barrows and the remains of 4 linear dykes. 
 The most significant of the barrows is the 'King's Barrow' at Stoborough, which probably dates from the Early Bronze Age. The dykes are on Worgret Heath; they are undated but analogy with similar structures elsewhere suggests Romano-British origins. In the Roman period there was also a salt industry of significant size on the shore of Poole Harbour.

Arne village is not recorded in the Domesday Book. The earliest record of the village is from 1285, though the parish church, which consists of a single-cell chancel and nave, dates from around 1200, and has not been substantially altered since, though it was restored in the 19th century and in 1952.

The village was owned by the wealthy Shaftesbury Abbey until its dissolution in 1539, but was never a large village, and by 1894 its population was only 123. A school had been opened in the village in 1832, but the shrinking population forced it to close in 1922.

In medieval times the parish of Arne was much smaller; it covered  on the Arne peninsula and adjacent heathland. In the late 19th century it was expanded to include the two parts of Wareham Holy Trinity parish that separately covered Stoborough and Middlebere, and the part of Wareham Lady St Mary parish that covered Worgret, resulting in Arne parish more than doubling in size.

During World War I Holton Heath, three miles north west of Arne in the neighbouring parish of Wareham St Martin, was chosen as the site of the Royal Navy Cordite Factory, a key site for the manufacture of explosives used in military shells. Its isolated location would have mitigated civilian losses should an explosion have occurred, but following the start of World War II, the factory was a clear target for bombing raids by German aircraft. With the main flight path to Holton Heath passing right over Arne, the government created several "Starfish" decoy sites in the village. These consisted of a heavily guarded site containing a network of tar barrels and pipes containing kerosene that could be ignited when needed to give the appearance of a burning factory, thus confusing pilots into bombing empty countryside.

On the night of 3–4 June 1942, the decoy was brought into action and aircraft heavily bombed the decoy site, causing a fire that burned for six weeks. The decoy operation was a success, leaving the Cordite Factory untouched, but Arne was devastated, with over 200 bomb craters counted on the Arne Peninsula. The Germans, on the other hand, were convinced they had heavily damaged the factory and even Lord Haw Haw reported that it had been badly hit. However, the village was left almost uninhabitable and the remaining occupants were given a month's notice that Arne was to be abandoned by 10 August.

After the war, the village remained largely derelict until the late 1950s, and in 1966 the Arne Peninsula was put under the protection of the RSPB.

Geography

Demography

At the 2011 census, the parish had a population of 1,297.

Governance

Until 1 April 2019, Arne parish formed part of the Purbeck local government district; it now forms part of the Dorset unitary authority area. The parish forms the majority of the population of Creech Barrow electoral ward, which extends to the English Channel at Kimmeridge. The population of the ward at the 2011 census was 1,764.

Bird reserve

Arne is well known for the Arne RSPB reserve (Royal Society for the Protection of Birds), which is adjacent to the village. It also lies within the Dorset Area of Outstanding Natural Beauty.

Gallery

References

External links

Civil parishes in Dorset
Isle of Purbeck
Villages in Dorset